Tommaso is a 2016 Italian comedy-drama film written by, directed by and starring Kim Rossi Stuart. It was screened out of competition at the 73rd edition of the Venice Film Festival.

Plot 
After a lengthy relationship, Tommaso manages to get away from Chiara, his companion. Now waiting for him - he thinks - is endless freedom and countless adventures. He is a young, handsome, kind and romantic actor, but he perpetually swings between elan and resistance and soon realizes he is only free to repeat the same script: in short, he is a "ticking bomb" on the road of the women he meets. His relationships always end in the same painful way, between unspeakable thoughts and paralyzing fears. This repetition compulsion is one day finally interrupted and within him it generates an absolute void. Tommaso is now alone and has no more escape: he has to confront that moment of his past when everything stopped.

Cast 
Kim Rossi Stuart as Tommaso
Cristiana Capotondi as  Federica
 Camilla Diana  as  Sonia
Jasmine Trinca as Chiara
Dagmar Lassander as  Stefania
Serra Yilmaz as  Alberta
Edoardo Pesce as  Gianni
Renato Scarpa as  Mario
 Melissa Bartolini  as  Marcella
Alessandro Genovesi as  Genovesi

Reception

Tommaso grossed $350,367 at the box office.

See also    
 List of Italian films of 2016

References

External links 

2016 comedy-drama films
Italian comedy-drama films
2010s Italian films